Joseph Grimond, Baron Grimond,  (29 July 1913 – 24 October 1993) was a British politician, leader of the Liberal Party for eleven years from 1956 to 1967 and again briefly on an interim basis in 1976.

Grimond was a long-term supporter of Scottish home rule; and, during his leadership, he successfully advocated for the Liberal Party to support the abolition of Britain's nuclear arsenal.

Early life

Grimond was born in St Andrews, Fife, and was educated at Eton College and Balliol College, Oxford. He was at school and university with, among others, cricket commentator Brian Johnston and playwright William Douglas-Home. He received a first-class honours degree in Politics, Philosophy and Economics. He later became a barrister, being admitted to the bar as a member of Middle Temple.

Member of Parliament

After serving as a Major in World War II, he was selected by the Liberal Party to contest Orkney and Shetland, the most northerly constituency in the United Kingdom. He narrowly missed capturing the seat in 1945 but entered Parliament at the 1950 general election for the constituency. The Liberals and their successors, the Liberal Democrats, have continuously retained the seat to the present day.

Grimond continued to represent the constituency until he retired from politics in 1983, and regularly polled more than 60% of the votes cast in the northern Scottish archipelagos.

Leader of the Liberal Party
The party Grimond inherited from former leader Clement Davies had commanded barely 2.5% of the vote at the general election of 1955, but even that figure amounted to a modest revival in Liberal Party fortunes compared with 1951. This progress increased under the leadership of Grimond who proved himself to be a man of considerable personal charm and intelligence, with substantial gifts as public speaker and as an author. Widely respected as well as trusted, he ensured that by the time he left the leadership in 1967, the Liberals had once again become a notable political force.

It was during his tenure that the first post-war Liberal revival took place: under Grimond's leadership, the Liberals doubled their seat tally and won historic by-elections at Torrington in 1958 (the first by-election gain by the Liberal Party for 29 years), Orpington in 1962, and Roxburgh, Selkirk and Peebles in 1965.

In 1962, the Liberals almost succeeded in capturing Blackpool North, West Derbyshire and Chippenham from the Conservatives and Leicester North East from Labour. Grimond's dynamic and principled leadership proved attractive to many young aspiring politicians, including John Pardoe and three future party leaders, David Steel, Paddy Ashdown and Sir Menzies Campbell.

In 1967, having led the party through three general elections, he made way for a younger leader, the charismatic Jeremy Thorpe. In 1976, when Thorpe was forced to resign because of a scandal, Grimond stepped in as interim leader until the election of a replacement, David Steel.

Among other posts, Grimond was a barrister and publisher in the 1930s, an army major during World War II, Secretary of the National Trust for Scotland from 1947 to 1949, and held the Rectorships of the University of Edinburgh and the University of Aberdeen and the Chancellorship of the University of Kent at Canterbury (elected in 1970). His many books include The Liberal Future (1959, credited with reinvigorating radical liberalism as a coherent modern ideology), The Liberal Challenge (1963), and Memoirs (1979). 

He was the subject of This Is Your Life in 1983 when he was surprised by Eamonn Andrews.

Retirement and death
Upon leaving the House of Commons, he was created a life peer as Baron Grimond, of Firth in the County of Orkney on 12 October 1983. He remained devoted to his former parliamentary constituency, and was buried in Finstown on Orkney.

Marriage and children
In 1938, Grimond married liberal politician Laura Bonham Carter (1918–1994). His wife was the granddaughter of the former Liberal Prime Minister H. H. Asquith, and the daughter of the influential Liberal politician and peer Violet Asquith (1887–1969) and her politician and civil servant husband, Maurice Bonham Carter. Laura Grimond was also the sister of another life peer, Mark Bonham Carter, (1922–1994) who was the victor of the 1958 by-election at Torrington.
The couple had four children:
 (Joseph) Andrew Grimond (26 March 1939 – 23 March 1966), a sub-editor of The Scotsman, lived in Edinburgh until his suicide at the age of 26.
 Grizelda "Gelda" (Jane) Grimond (1942–2017), who had a daughter Katherine (born 1973) by the film and stage director Tony Richardson. Her daughter Katherine Hess is married to Steven Hess,  and had three children as of 2017.
 John (Jasper) Grimond (born October 1946), a former foreign editor of The Economist as Johnny Grimond, now writer at large for the publication, who in 1973 married Kate Fleming (born 1946), eldest daughter of the writer Peter Fleming and actress Celia Johnson, and the couple have three children together. He is the main author of The Economist Style Guide.
 (Thomas) Magnus Grimond (born 13 June 1959), journalist and financial correspondent, married to travel author Laura Grimond (née Raison), and has four children.

Writings
The Liberal Future (Faber and Faber, London, 1959)
The Liberal Challenge (Hollis and Carter, London, 1963)
(with Brian Nevel) The Referendum (Rex Collings, London, 1975)
The Common Welfare (Temple Smith, London, 1978)
Memoirs (Heinemann, London, 1979)
A Personal Manifesto (Martin Robertson, Oxford, 1983)
The St. Andrews of Jo Grimond (Alan Sutton, St. Andrew's, 1992)

Grimond was also a prolific writer of pamphlets: see the McManus biography (below) for a complete list of publications.

References

Sources
Peter Barberis, Liberal Lion: Jo Grimond, A Political Life (I.B. Tauris, London, 2005)
 Jo Grimond (Lord Grimond) 1913–93 biography from the Liberal Democrat History Group

Further reading
Michael McManus, Jo Grimond: Towards the Sound of Gunfire (Birlinn, Edinburgh, 2001)
Peter Sloman, "Jo Grimond and the Liberal Revival, 1956–64," in The Liberal Party and the Economy, 1929–1964 (2014)

External links 

 
 

1913 births
1993 deaths
Alumni of Balliol College, Oxford
Asquith family
British Army personnel of World War II
Chancellors of the University of Kent
Commanders of the Order of the British Empire
Fife and Forfar Yeomanry officers
Leaders of the Liberal Party (UK)
Liberal Democrats (UK) life peers
Members of the Middle Temple
Members of the Order of the Companions of Honour
Scottish Liberal Party MPs
Members of the Parliament of the United Kingdom for Orkney and Shetland
Members of the Privy Council of the United Kingdom
People educated at Gibbs School
People educated at Eton College
People from St Andrews
Rectors of the University of Aberdeen
Rectors of the University of Edinburgh
UK MPs 1950–1951
UK MPs 1951–1955
UK MPs 1955–1959
UK MPs 1959–1964
UK MPs 1964–1966
UK MPs 1966–1970
UK MPs 1970–1974
UK MPs 1974
UK MPs 1974–1979
UK MPs 1979–1983
20th-century Scottish lawyers
People associated with Shetland
Life peers created by Elizabeth II